PITS or Pits may refer to
 Perpetration-induced traumatic stress
 Educational Institution: Parisutham Institute of Technology & Science
 Motorsports: Pit stop
 Plural of Pit (disambiguation)
PIT Solutions, an Indian IT company
Palestinian Information Technology Society, a grassroots Palestinian group in IT